Senator Comstock may refer to:

Adam Comstock (1740–1819), New York State Senate
Albert C. Comstock (1845–1910), New York State Senate
Daniel Webster Comstock (1840–1917), Indiana State Senate
Horace H. Comstock (died 1861), Michigan State Senate
Noah D. Comstock (1832–1890), Michigan State Senate
Solomon Comstock (1842–1933), Minnesota State Senate